Baron Lilford, of Lilford in the County of Northampton, is a title in the Peerage of Great Britain. It was created in 1797 for Thomas Powys, who had previously represented Northamptonshire in the House of Commons. His grandson, the third Baron, served as a Lord-in-waiting (government whip) from 1837 to 1841 in the Whig administration of Lord Melbourne. He was succeeded by his son, the fourth Baron, an ornithologist.

On the death of his younger son, the sixth Baron (who succeeded his elder brother), in 1949, the line of the third Baron failed. The late Baron was succeeded by his second cousin twice removed, the seventh Baron. He was the great-great-grandson of Robert Vernon Powys, second son of the second Baron. , the title is held by his only son Mark Powys, the eighth Baron, who succeeded in 2005. The family seat from 1711 until the 1990s was Lilford Hall in Northamptonshire.

The current Baron Lilford retains ownership of land in Jersey, South Africa and West Lancashire, including the Bank Hall Estate, which were inherited in 1860 by Thomas Atherton Powys, 3rd Baron Lilford, upon the death of his wife's cousin George Anthony Legh Keck.

Barons Lilford (1797)
Thomas Powys, 1st Baron Lilford (1743–1800)
Thomas Powys, 2nd Baron Lilford (1775–1825)
Thomas Atherton Powys, 3rd Baron Lilford (1801–1861)
Thomas Littleton Powys, 4th Baron Lilford (1833–1896)
John Powys, 5th Baron Lilford (1863–1945)
Stephen Powys, 6th Baron Lilford (1869–1949)
George Vernon Powys, 7th Baron Lilford (1931–2005)
Mark Vernon Powys, 8th Baron Lilford (born 1975)

The heir presumptive is the present holder's second cousin once removed, Robert Charles Lilford Powys (born 1930), the next-senior great-grandson in the male line of descent from Robert Powys, a male-line grandson of the 2nd Baron; he has no living issue.

After the heir presumptive, the next in line is the present holder's second cousin once removed, Michael John Powys (born 1934), another great-grandson in the male line of descent from Robert Powys; he has a son, Victor Michael (born 1961), who in turn has a son, Matthew Paul (born 1996).

Male-line family tree

Arms

Notes

References 

Kidd, Charles, Williamson, David (editors). Debrett's Peerage and Baronetage (1990 edition). New York: St Martin's Press, 1990, 

Baronies in the Peerage of Great Britain
Noble titles created in 1797
Bank Hall